St. Shott's is the southernmost town in the Canadian province of Newfoundland and Labrador. A popular claim the town is associated with is having the most fog. In the Canada 2021 Census, the town had a population of 55.

St. Shott's is accessible by road via St. Shott's Road (Route 10–52), connecting the town with Route 10 (Irish Loop Drive).

Demographics 

Shipwrecks
The town has had numerous shipwrecks occur in the waters off its coast over the last five centuries. The Dutch steamship "Anton van Driel" ran aground on a foggy day while en route from Nova Scotia to Rotterdam in the Netherlands. Of the 30 individuals on board, only three survived drowning after being rescued by a tugboat, and only one body was ever recovered, that of a man named Hajo de Jonge.

Climate
St. Shott's has an extremely water moderated subarctic climate (Dfc). At sea level, this climate is the second closest to the equator in the Northern Hemisphere, behind the Kuril Islands. Due to the moderating effect of the Atlantic Ocean and Labrador Current, extreme maxima and minima are very limited. Summers are almost nonexistent, with temperatures above  being very rare. Winters are very mild by Canadian standards but can last half of the year or more some years. Any snow that falls is usually melted by falling rain, and ends up either completely melted or as leftover slush. Days with highs above  average 1.9, and with highs below  average 57.8.

References

See also
 List of cities and towns in Newfoundland and Labrador

Towns in Newfoundland and Labrador